Mark Tedford is an American politician and insurance agent who is the Oklahoma House of Representatives member from the 69th district. He represents Jenks and South Tulsa. He ran unopposed for the seat in 2022 to succeed retiring Representative Sheila Dills.

Oklahoma House of Representatives

2022 election
Tedford was elected to the Oklahoma House of Representatives after running unopposed to succeed retiring Representative Sheila Dills in the 2022 Oklahoma House of Representatives election. He was sworn in on November 16, 2022.

Tenure
Prior to his first legislative session, Tedford advocated for an increase in teacher pay by arguing current wages were not competitive in the Oklahoma jobs market.

References

Living people
Republican Party members of the Oklahoma House of Representatives
21st-century American politicians
1969 births